Jordan Radev (born March 4, 1976) is a Bulgarian wrestler and professional mixed martial artist. He was the second Bulgarian mixed martial artist to fight in the Ultimate Fighting Championship in its middleweight division.

Radev had two bouts in the UFC - at UFC Fight Night 10 against Andrew McFedries, and at UFC 79 against Dean Lister. After the UFC bouts, his next fight was scheduled to be against the Cuban/Australian judoka Hector Lombard in the Australian promotion Cage Fighting Championships. However, he was denied a visa to Australia and therefore did not appear.

Besides the UFC, Radev has fought in various other organizations, marking notable wins against the Polish MMA legend Grzegorz Jakubowski in KSW 9 – Konfrontacja, Yuya Shirai in M-1 Global, and against Alexander Shlemenko in the Helsinki Fight Festival. He is also the head MMA coach of the Bulgarian National MMA team in the M-1 Challenge fighting league.

While still active as an MMA fighter, Radev is currently also the head MMA trainer in the Fight Factory in Brooklyn, New York,  - the largest boxing and MMA gym on the US East Coast.

Mixed martial arts record

|-
| Loss
| align=center| 23–5
| Paul Daley
| Decision (unanimous)
| BAMMA 7: Trigg vs. Wallhead
| 
| align=center| 3
| align=center| 5:00
| Birmingham, England
| 
|-
| Win
| align=center| 23–4
| Maro Perak
| Decision (split)
| M-1 Selection 2010: Western Europe Round 3
| 
| align=center| 3
| align=center| 5:00
| Helsinki, Finland
| 
|-
| Win
| align=center| 22–4
| Wanderson Silva
| Decision (unanimous)
| BMMAF - Warriors 12
| 
| align=center| 2
| align=center| 5:00
| Ruse, Bulgaria
| 
|-
| Win
| align=center| 21–4
| Alexander Shlemenko
| KO (punch)
| FF 26 – Fight Festival 26
| 
| align=center| 2
| align=center| 4:27
| Helsinki, Finland
| 
|-
| Win
| align=center| 20–4
| Danny Smit
| Decision (unanimous)
| M-1 Challenge 15: Brazil
| 
| align=center| 3
| align=center| 5:00
| São Paulo, Brazil
| 
|-
| Loss
| align=center| 19–4
| Herbert Goodman
| TKO (punches)
| M-1 Challenge 13: Bulgaria
| 
| align=center| 2
| align=center| 4:59
| Burgas, Bulgaria
| 
|-
| Win
| align=center| 19–3
| Rafael Rodriguez
| Technical Submission (rear naked choke)
| M-1 Challenge 10: Finland
| 
| align=center| 1
| align=center| 1:08
| Helsinki, Finland
| 
|-
| Win
| align=center| 18–3
| Faycal Hussin
| Decision (unanimous)
| BMMAF: Warriors 6
| 
| align=center| 2
| align=center| 5:00
| Stara Zagora, Bulgaria
| 
|-
| Win
| align=center| 17–3
| Damir Mihajlovic
| Decision (unanimous)
| BMMAF: Warriors 5
| 
| align=center| 2
| align=center| 5:00
| Plovdiv, Bulgaria
| 
|-
| Win
| align=center| 16–3
| Yuya Shirai
| Decision (majority)
| M-1 Challenge 6: Korea
| 
| align=center| 2
| align=center| 5:00
| Seoul, South Korea
| 
|-
| Win
| align=center| 15–3
| Denis Smith
| Submission (heel hook)
| BMMAF: Warriors 4
| 
| align=center| 2
| align=center| 1:22
| Sveti Vlas, Bulgaria
| 
|-
| Win
| align=center| 14–3
| Alexander Stefkovski
| Submission (keylock)
| BMMAF: Warriors 3
| 
| align=center| 1
| align=center| 3:15
| Burgas, Bulgaria
| 
|-
| Win
| align=center| 13–3
| Grzegorz Jakubowski
| Decision
| KSW IX: Konfrontacja
| 
| align=center| 2
| align=center| 5:00
| Warsaw, Poland
| 
|-
| Win
| align=center| 12–3
| Rosen Dimitrov
| Decision (unanimous)
| Real Pain Challenge 1
| 
| align=center| 3
| align=center| 5:00
| Sofia, Bulgaria
| 
|-
| Loss
| align=center| 11–3
| Dean Lister
| Decision (unanimous)
| UFC 79
| 
| align=center| 3
| align=center| 5:00
| Las Vegas, Nevada, United States
| 
|-
| Loss
| align=center| 11–2
| Drew McFedries
| KO (punches)
| UFC Fight Night 10
| 
| align=center| 1
| align=center| 0:33
| Hollywood, Florida, United States
| 
|-
| Win
| align=center| 11–1
| Ivan Brguljan
| Decision
| Kam Lung: Only the Strongest Survive 5
| 
| align=center| 2
| 
| Zuidland, Netherlands
| 
|-
| Win
| align=center| 10–1
| Martin Zawada
| Decision
| 2H2H: Road to Japan
| 
| align=center| 1
| align=center| 10:00
| Netherlands
| 
|-
| Win
| align=center| 9–1
| Antony Rea
| TKO
| 2H2H: Road to Japan
| 
| align=center| 1
| align=center| 2:24
| Netherlands
| 
|-
| Loss
| align=center| 8–1
| Robert Jocz
| Decision
| KSW V: Konfrontacja
| 
| 
| 
| Warsaw, Poland
| 
|-
| Win
| align=center| 8–0
| Martin Malkhasyan
| Decision
| Fury FC 2: 93 kg GP
| 
| align=center| 2
| 
| Warsaw, Poland
| 
|-
| Win
| align=center| 7–0
| Brian Maulany
| TKO (rope escape)
| K-1 MAX Netherlands 2006
| 
| align=center| 2
| 
| Utrecht, Netherlands
| 
|-
| Win
| align=center| 6–0
| Jorge Santiago
| Decision (unanimous)
| It's Showtime Boxing & MMA Event 2005 Amsterdam
| 
| align=center| 2
| align=center| 5:00
| Amsterdam, Netherlands
| 
|-
| Win
| align=center| 5–0
| Arshak Dabagiyan
| TKO (strikes)
| 2 Hot 2 Handle
| 
| align=center| 2
| align=center| n/a
| Rotterdam, Netherlands
| 
|-
| Win
| align=center| 4–0
| Lars Besand
| KO (head kick)
| Mix Fight Gala
| 
| align=center| 1
| align=center| 0:08
| Almere Stad, Netherlands
| 
|-
| Win
| align=center| 3–0
| Nordin Ben-Sallah
| Submission (toe hold)
| Rings Holland: The Untouchables
| 
| align=center| 3
| align=center| 0:31
| Utrecht, Netherlands
| 
|-
| Win
| align=center| 2–0
| Rafles la Rose
| KO (punch)
| 2H2H 6: Simply the Best 6
| 
| align=center| 1
| align=center| 5:49
| Rotterdam, Netherlands
| 
|-
| Win
| align=center| 1–0
| Dennis Scholten
| Submission (choke)
| Together Productions: Night of the Sensation
| 
| align=center| 1
| align=center| n/a
| Steenwijk, Netherlands
|

References

External links
 
 

Living people
Bulgarian male mixed martial artists
Middleweight mixed martial artists
Mixed martial artists utilizing wrestling
Sportspeople from Plovdiv
1976 births
Ultimate Fighting Championship male fighters